Phakphok is a town and Village Development Committee (VDC) in Ilam District in the Province No. 1 of eastern Nepal. At the time of the 1991 Nepal census it had a population of 4,233 persons living in 734 individual households.

Phakphok VDC borders with Panchthar district at north west whereas Ektappa VDC borders at the east. Other VDC's like Chamaita and Amchok are also linked with Phakphok VDC at north east and south west respectively.

Divisions

Phakphok VDC is divided into 9 sections commonly called as 'wards' based on population and area. Some of the 'wards' are also known by names for example: Khamang, Dharnekhop, Putalikharka, Kolbhote, Saptin. Kolbhote is located at the central part of the VDC where major facilities like higher studies, medical and markets are found. Each of the  'wards'  has at least a primary (class 0 to 5) or higher-level school, where majority of kids attend their first schooling. VDC has one higher secondary school at Kolbhote where higher studies ( class +11 and 12) are conducted. Medical facilities in VDC is provided by heath clinic at Kolbhote together with small medical stores/clinic scattered across the other  'wards'.

Socio-Economic

Agriculture has been major occupation of the people living in Phakphok- which is also the major income source of most of the families. Most of the major cash crops like Nepali tea and Cardamom (Nepali-अलैंची) are grown at the northern parts of VDC whereas crops like ginger is grown on southern parts. Most of the cash crops are exported to India, Bangladesh and other countries. Other crops like maize, rice, barley, potato etc. are also grown in the region. Phakphok VDC is connected with Mechi Highway at Ranke bazar located at the border between Panchthar and Ilam district. Roads from Mechi Highway to Kolbhote are graveled which runs smoothly during September to May. During June to August, sometimes roads are paralyzed by landslid caused by monsoon. Regular public transport (most common- taxi or van) can be found connecting Kolbhote and district capital ilam commonly called as ilam bazar. All most all the phakphok VDC is electrified mainly from hydro electricity generated from the local river. Major electricity is provided by Mai Hydropower Station, Puwa Khola Hydropower Station and other small hydro power plants. Phakphok micro hydropower generated from Phakphok river provides most of the electricity at the southern parts of the VDC.

Geography and Climate

Phakphok VDC is hilly area located on the base of Mahabharat range with the average altitude of 2000-3000 meter. Phakphok khola is the major river of the VDC on the western border and another being Tyawa khola (River) on the eastern border. Northern parts of the VDC (ward-3,4,5) experiences quite heavy rainfall during monsoon season and are relatively cold with annual temperature ( min-8 to max- 23 °C). Southern part (ward-9) is relatively warm place where major rice cultivation is done. Mixed vegetation are found in the areas: for example trees like pine, Aluus ( Nepali -उत्तिश), schima (Nepali-चिलाउने), Castanopsis tribuloides (Nepali-कटुस) are commonly found in the areas.

People

Racially mixed people lived in the areas both who has been migrated from other parts of the country and the local indigenous people. People from different races like Limbu, Magar Chhettri, Rai, Tamang etc.  live together in a mixed society.

References

External links
UN map of the municipalities of Ilam District

Populated places in Ilam District